WIKX (92.9 FM) is a commercial radio station located in Charlotte Harbor, Florida, United States, broadcasting to the Southwest Florida area.  WIKX broadcasts a country music format branded as "Kix Country". , air personalities include Todd Matthews.

External links
Official website

IKX
Country radio stations in the United States
IHeartMedia radio stations
1970 establishments in Florida
Radio stations established in 1970